Green Meadow is a historic home located near Odessa, New Castle County, Delaware.  It is a two-story, five-bay brick dwelling with interior brick chimneys at both gable ends.  It has a gable roof with dormers. The house measures approximately 50 feet by 19 feet and was built in phases, with the earliest built before 1789. It is in the Federal style.  Also on the property are a contributing stone barn (1809) and brick smokehouse.

It was listed on the National Register of Historic Places in 1992.

References

Houses on the National Register of Historic Places in Delaware
Federal architecture in Delaware
Houses in New Castle County, Delaware
National Register of Historic Places in New Castle County, Delaware